Hoërskool Marais Viljoen (English: Marais Viljoen High School) is a public Afrikaans medium co-educational high school situated in the city of Alberton in the Gauteng province of South Africa. It is one of the top and most academic schools in Gauteng province.

History
The school is named after former State President and MP for Alberton, Marais Viljoen. He officially opened the school on 1 September 1961.

Mr Piet Myburgh was appointed as the first principal. He was succeeded by Mr Philip Fouché in 1979.

Mr Fouché retired in 1989 and was replaced by Hannes le Roux from April 1989 to March 2004. In April 2004 Mrs Martie Heystek was appointed as acting principal. On 1 January 2005 she was appointed as the principal of Marais Viljoen. 

From its inception, Marais Viljoen was classified as a technical and vocational school, but the vocational aspect was phased out in 1979. Marais Viljoen has since offered a technical, scientific and general study direction, with a broad choice of subjects.

As a result of the expansion in the fields of study, it was decided in 1995 that Marais Viljoen Technical would in future be known as Marais Viljoen High School.

Sport 
Marais Viljoen High School has been performing very well on sports during the year. 

The sports that are offered in the school are:

 Archery 
 Athletics 
 Chess 
 Cricket 
 Cross country 
 Equestrian 
 Golf
 Hockey (Boys & Girls) 
 Netball (Girls) 
 Rugby (Boys) 
 Shooting
 Sqaush
 Swimming
 Table tennis
 Tennis
 Water polo

References

External links
Official website

Schools in Gauteng